The 1889 Virginia Orange and Blue football team represented the University of Virginia as an independent during the 1889 college football season. The team had no known coach, and went 4–2 and claims a Southern championship.

Schedule

References

Virginia
Virginia Cavaliers football seasons
Virginia Orange and Blue football